Taylor Ho Bynum (born 1975) is a musician, composer, educator and writer. His main instrument is the cornet, but he also plays numerous similar instruments, including flugelhorn and trumpet.

Early life
Bynum was born in Baltimore in 1975, and grew up in Boston. His parents were fans of music, and professional musicians were often in the family home. Bynum's sister is writer Sarah Shun-lien Bynum.

Bynum began playing the trumpet at the age of ten, and played classical music in youth orchestras when at high school. At the age of 15, funding for music was cut at his school, so he joined the jazz big band at a local university instead; there, he was mentored by bass trombonist and tubaist Bill Lowe. Working in an ice cream shop meant that Bynum was able to organize weekly jazz concerts there. Around the early 1990s, Bynum first played with drummer Tomas Fujiwara. Continuing his interest in music, Bynum attended Wesleyan University, where he studied with a major influence on his future – Anthony Braxton – as well as with Pheeroan akLaff, Jay Hoggard, and others. Bynum graduated from Wesleyan in 1998.

Later life and career
In 1999, he played on two Braxton albums and a duo album with Eric Rosenthal. In addition to Lowe and Braxton, Bill Dixon was a formative influence on Bynum. His recording continued in 2001: on Trio Ex Nihilo with Curt Newton and Jeff Song, and with the Sound Visions Orchestra of Alan Silva. A year later, he recorded duets with Braxton and Rosenthal, as well as playing on the Fully Celebrated Orchestra's Marriage of Heaven and Earth, and creating a band with himself as cornetist, plus an electric guitar and string quartet, together named SpiderMonkey Strings. He also began a master's degree in music composition at Wesleyan. His sextet released its first album, The Middle Picture, in 2007, and Asphalt Flowers Forking Paths two years later. Bynum was also a member of Jason Kao Hwang's quartet named Edge. From 2007, Bynum has been part of The Convergence Quartet, with pianist Alexander Hawkins, bassist Dominic Lash, and drummer Harris Eisenstadt; they released their fourth album, Owl Jacket, in 2016. In 2007, Bynum co-founded the record label Firehouse 12, with engineer Nick Lloyd. The label's first release was Braxton's  9  Compositions (consisting of nine CDs and one DVD), and Bynum's The Middle Picture was next.

In September 2010, Bynum toured New England, traveling between gigs on a bicycle. In the same year, he recorded the quartet Searching for Adam. This was followed by Apparent Distance in 2011 and Navigation by his 7-Tette two years later. The former was a four-part suite, funded by Chamber Music America's 2010 New Jazz Works. The Throes was also from 2011, and was co-led by Nate Wooley, with whom Bynum had played for two years. Bynum released Navigation around 2013; it consisted of four performances of a single piece, with two being released on LP and two on CD (all four were released for digital download, which was also available to purchasers of either physical release). Bynum expounded on his releasing four recordings of the same piece: "I want to ask listeners to consider the composition as a set of possibilities rather than a fixed document, to encourage them to enjoy the mutable nature of the music in multiple realizations rather than focusing on one particular performance." In 2014, he undertook another "Acoustic Bicycle Tour" from Vancouver, Canada down the West Coast to Tijuana, Mexico, captured in a short documentary film by Chris Jonas. Book of Three was a trio album in 2014, and Enter the PlusTet two years later was performed by a 15-piece band. A new quartet, Illegal Crowns, was recorded in 2014.

In the area of education, Bynum has led jazz ensembles at Northeastern University, and has been the director of the  Coast Jazz Orchestra at Dartmouth College since July 2017. He has also written about music for The New Yorker magazine. He has also served as the executive director of Anthony Braxton's Tri-Centric Foundation since 2010, producing and performing on most of Braxton's recent major projects, including his Trillium operas and his Sonic Genomes. A further activity has been organizing music events, including the Sound Genome project in Vancouver in 2010 and a festival at the Roulette club in New York City the following year.

Composition and playing styles
A reviewer of Next commented that Bynum "deploys a litany of buzzes, whistles, drones, pinched fanfares and garrulous brass muttering in acrobatic arcs that twist and somersault." The overlaps of composition and improvisation are explored by Bynum; a reviewer of Illegal Crowns and Enter the PlusTet observed that they "are equally imaginative and revolutionary in their own 
right, characterized by a dogged exploration of the ebb and flow between composition and spontaneity."

Awards
Bynum was Down Beat magazine's Rising Star Trumpeter in its critics poll of 2017.

Discography
An asterisk (*) indicates that the year is that of release.

As leader/co-leader

References

External links
"Taylor Ho Bynum: Notions of Inspiration". National Endowment for the Arts audio interview.

American cornetists
Living people
Wesleyan University alumni
1975 births
Cuneiform Records artists
CIMP artists
Clean Feed Records artists
RogueArt artists
Firehouse 12 Records artists
NoBusiness Records artists